Jason McDermott (born 15 September 1985 in Spanish Town, Jamaica), better known by his stage name Stylo G, is a British-Jamaican dancehall recording artist known for his three hit singles "My Yout", "Call Mi a Leader" and "Soundbwoy". "Soundbwoy" peaked at number 18 on the UK Singles Chart. He also featured on the hit song "Come Over" by the British electronic group Clean Bandit. He also got famous for his collaboration with Divine for the song "Mirchi".

Biography
McDermott's family relocated to London at the age of fifteen, following the murder of his father, artist and producer Poison Chang. He currently resides in South London.

History
Stylo G's first initial hit was a grime song, "My Yout", featuring Stickman and Ice Kid. The song gained some notability within the grime scene. As a result of being in the UK, he collaborated with many UK rap and grime artists such as Giggs, Chip, Zeph Ellis, and Wretch 32.

In 2011, Stylo G released "Call Mi A Yardie".

In 2012, Stylo G featured in the Red Bull Culture Clash alongside Rita Ora and Usher.

On 26 May 2013, he released the single "Soundbwoy", his first UK Top 20 single. The song also reached number 29 in Scotland. In 2014, he appeared on the Clean Bandit song "Come Over" which peaked at number 45 on the UK Singles Chart. In September 2014, he was nominated for a MOBO Award in the Best Reggae Act category.

In 2019, police raided an Airbnb residence Stylo G was staying at in Caymanas Estate, St Catherine in Jamaica. The police surrounded the house and showed a warrant, explaining they were looking for guns. After a 5 hour search, they found nothing.

Discography

Singles

As featured artist

Guest appearances

Notes

References

External links

 Video Interview with Stylo G (Reggae.Today)

British reggae musicians
21st-century Black British male singers
Reggae fusion artists
1985 births
Living people
People from Spanish Town
Jamaican emigrants to the United Kingdom